The men's point race at the 2010 Commonwealth Games in New Delhi, India took place on 6 October 2010 at the Indira Gandhi Arena. Two qualification heats were held to determine the participants in the final.

Final

External links
 Reports

Track cycling at the 2010 Commonwealth Games
Cycling at the Commonwealth Games – Men's points race